Roger Perry (May 7, 1933 – July 12, 2018) was an American film and television actor whose career began in the late 1950s. He served as an intelligence officer in the United States Air Force during the early 1950s.

Career

Television 
In the 1960–1961 television season, Perry portrayed attorney Jim Harrigan, Jr. in Harrigan and Son, with Pat O'Brien as his father. He guest-starred on numerous American television series from the 1950s through the 1980s. His first television appearance was as Ted Jarvis in the 1958 episode "Paper Bullets" of the syndicated crime drama, U.S. Marshal. He appeared with James Coburn and John Dehner in the 1960 episode "Friend of the Family" of The Texan.  He co-starred in the 1963–1964 series Arrest and Trial as Detective Sergeant Dan Kirby.

In NBC's Star Trek episode "Tomorrow Is Yesterday" (1967) he guested as a 20th-century U.S. Air Force pilot. Other television series in which he appeared include Combat!, Dr. Kildare, The Six Million Dollar Man, Wonder Woman, The Bob Newhart Show,  Emergency!, Love, American Style, The Andy Griffith Show, The Invaders, Ironside, The F.B.I., The Eleventh Hour, The Munsters, Barnaby Jones,  Adam-12, Falcon Crest., and a recurring role as headmaster Charles Parker on The Facts of Life.

Films 
Perry starred in two American International Pictures horror films featuring the vampire character Count Yorga. In Count Yorga, Vampire (1970), Perry portrayed Dr. James Hayes, the protagonist who uncovers the true nature of Yorga (but is attacked and killed by Yorga's brides). However, Perry returned as a different lead character in the sequel, The Return of Count Yorga (1971), as Professor David Baldwin. He also starred alongside Ray Milland and Rosey Grier as Dr. Philip Desmond in the cult classic ''The Thing with Two Heads.

Personal life 
Perry's first wife was Patricia Perry. They had 2 children, Christopher Perry and Dana Perry McNerney. They divorced in 1965. Perry married actress/comedian Jo Anne Worley on May 11, 1975. They divorced in 2000 and had no children. He later married actress Joyce Bulifant, and in 2014, Perry and Bulifant were honored with a Golden Palm Star on the Walk of Stars in Palm Springs, California. Perry had one biological grandchild, Parker McNerney, by his daughter, Dana.

Perry died from prostate cancer at age 85 at his home in Indian Wells, California, on July 12, 2018.

Filmography

References

External links

1933 births
2018 deaths
American male film actors
American male television actors
Actors from Davenport, Iowa
Male actors from Iowa
United States Air Force officers
Deaths from cancer in California
Deaths from prostate cancer
20th-century American male actors
21st-century American male actors
Military personnel from Iowa